The Brazilian National Jiu-Jitsu Championship (commonly known as the Brazilian Nationals) is a Brazilian Jiu-Jitsu (BJJ) tournament that is held in Barueri, Brazil. They are hosted annually by the International Brazilian Jiu-Jitsu Federation.

History

The Brazilian National Jiu-Jitsu Championship, also known as the "Brasileiro" has been held annually since 1996. The event was held up until 2012 at the Ginásio do Tijuca Tênis Clube in Rio de Janeiro and since 2013 has been held at the Ginásio Poliesportivo José Corrêa in Barueri, Brazil.

The IBJJF gives tournaments weighting which helps calculate the number of points an athlete can win via their participation. For the 2017/2018 IBJJF calendar the Brazilian National  has a weighting of 3.  This puts it behind in weighting importance to the World Jiu-Jitsu Championship
with a weighting of 7, the European Championship (Brazilian jiu-jitsu) and Pan-American Championship (jiu-jitsu) with weightings of 4 and alongside the Asian Open Championship (Brazilian jiu-jitsu).

In 2023, the IBJJF announced that FloGrappling had bought exclusive streaming rights to the tournament and would be the only place to watch the Brazilian National Jiu-Jitsu Championship moving forward.

Brazilian National Champions in Men's Brazilian Jiu Jitsu by Year and Weight

Brazilian National Champions in Women's Brazilian Jiu Jitsu by Year and Weight

See also 
 IBJJF
 World Championship
 World No-Gi Championship
 Pan Jiu-Jitsu Championship
 Pan Jiu-Jitsu No-Gi Championship
 European Open Championship
 European Open Nogi Championship
 Brazilian Nationals Jiu-Jitsu No-Gi Championship
 Asian Open Championship
 Abu Dhabi Combat Club Submission Wrestling World Championship

References

External links 

 Worlds BJJ
 World Jiu-Jitsu Championship 
 2010 Mundials results
World Championship
Results. ibjjf.com. URL last accessed June 10, 2008.
IBJJF Weight Classes 

Brazilian jiu-jitsu competitions